is a passenger railway station located in Ōmiya-ku, Saitama, Japan. It is a major interchange station for the East Japan Railway Company (JR East), and is also operated by the private railway operator Tōbu Railway.

Lines
The following lines serve the station.

JR East
  Tōhoku Shinkansen
  Hokkaidō Shinkansen
  Yamagata Shinkansen
  Akita Shinkansen
  Jōetsu Shinkansen
  Hokuriku Shinkansen
  Tōhoku Main Line (Utsunomiya Line)
  Takasaki Line
  Shōnan-Shinjuku Line
  Ueno-Tokyo Line
  Keihin-Tōhoku Line
  Saikyō Line
  Kawagoe Line

Tobu Railway
  Tobu Urban Park Line

Saitama New Urban Transit
 New Shuttle

Station layout

JR East platforms

No. 1–11 

These are five ground-level island platforms. Tracks 5 and 10 are through tracks not served by platforms.

No. 13–18 

These are three elevated island platforms at the third-floor level.

No. 19–22 

These are two underground island platforms.

|}

Tōbu platforms 

These platforms are bay platforms.

New Shuttle platform 

A single platform on the middle of a balloon loop.

History

Ōmiya Station opened on 16 March 1885 as a station of Nippon Railway.

In 1894, a railway workshop was opened to the north of the station, and this facility is still operated by JR East and Japan Freight Railway Company.

Passenger statistics
In fiscal 2019, the JR East station was used by an average of 257,344 passengers daily (boarding passengers only), making it the busiest station operated by JR East in Saitama Prefecture and the eighth-busiest station on the JR East network as a whole. The JR East passenger figures for previous years are as shown below. In fiscal 2019, the Tobu station was used by an average of 135,984 passengers daily.

Surrounding area
 The Railway Museum

Local and late-night buses and intercity coaches including ones to Narita International Airport and Haneda Airport airports also depart from this station.

See also
 List of railway stations in Japan
 Ōmiya Station (Kyoto)

References

External links

 Ōmiya Station information (JR East) 
 Ōmiya Station information (Tobu) 
 Ōmiya Station information (Saitama Prefectural Government) 

Railway stations in Saitama Prefecture
Tōhoku Shinkansen
Jōetsu Shinkansen
Tōhoku Main Line
Takasaki Line
Keihin-Tōhoku Line
Tobu Noda Line
Kawagoe Line
Utsunomiya Line
Stations of East Japan Railway Company
Stations of Tobu Railway
Railway stations in Saitama (city)
Railway stations in Japan opened in 1885
Hokuriku Shinkansen